The 2003 Indiana Hoosiers football team represented Indiana University Bloomington during the 2003 NCAA Division I-A football season. They participated as members of the Big Ten Conference. The Hoosiers played their home games at Memorial Stadium in Bloomington, Indiana. The team was coached by Gerry DiNardo in his second year as head coach.

Schedule

Roster

| special_teams_players=

}}

References

Indiana
Indiana Hoosiers football seasons
Indiana Hoosiers football